Novsko Ždrilo is a strait of the Adriatic Sea in Croatia between the  (a bay of the Adriatic) and the Velebit Channel. There are two bridges across the strait bearing the same name, Maslenica Bridge.

References

Adriatic Sea
Straits of Croatia
Landforms of Zadar County